"Batman: Under the Hood" (also known as "Batman: Under the Red Hood") is a comic book story arc published by DC Comics, written by Judd Winick and primarily illustrated by Doug Mahnke. Featuring Batman in the monthly title of the same name, it ran from February 2005 to August 2005, before going on a short hiatus and returning from November 2005 to April 2006. The story arc is also a part of the crossover  Infinite Crisis.

The story was notable for bringing long-dead Batman supporting character Jason Todd back to life, and reimagining him as a brutally violent antihero known as the Red Hood. Writer Jeph Loeb suggested in his Batman story "Hush" that Jason may, in fact, be alive, and Winick attached his return story to Jason's appearance in "Hush", before building an entire story around it. In summer 2010, Winick penned the six-issue arc, "Red Hood: The Lost Years", further detailing Jason's return and his training across the globe before his eventual collaboration with his former mentor's nemesis, Hush. In Summer 2010, the arc was adapted as a DC Universe Animated Original Movie entitled Batman: Under the Red Hood, earning widespread acclaim from critics and audiences.

Background
In 1988, writer Jim Starlin wrote the Batman story "A Death in the Family", that featured Jason Todd's death at the hands of the Joker. The story of Jason Todd remained virtually untouched for the better part of 15 years, until the character appeared to have been active in the "Hush" storyline. Although it was later revealed that Clayface had posed as Jason, the end of "Hush" raised questions about the whereabouts of Jason's body, as it was not in its grave.

Plot summary
A flashback to Batman's early years (post Dick Grayson's retirement as Robin) shows a young Jason Todd attempting to steal the wheels of the Batmobile. He becomes the new Robin. Years later, after being resurrected from his murder by the Joker due to an overlap of Hypertime-lines, Jason is institutionalized, escapes, and begins living on the streets. Ra's al Ghul and his daughter Talia kidnap Jason and hold him in care for a year. Ra's takes the trip to his Lazarus Pit. Talia pushes Jason into the pit, empowering and unleashing a new, stronger, more violent creature. Talia smuggles him out of the estate, giving him a bag containing money, a computer and memories of Batman, the Joker, and Red Hood. Jason attempts to reconnect with Batman but his former mentor fights and defeats him. Jason reveals the empire he has built for himself as he dons an initial costume identity of the Joker: the "Red Hood". 

Shortly after, the gangster Black Mask controls most of Gotham City's criminal underworld but is being countered by the Red Hood, who then destroys the top floor of Black Mask's fortress with a long-range explosive. Black Mask teams up with the Secret Society of Supervillains (Deathstroke, Captain Nazi, Hyena, Count Vertigo) to combat Red Hood. Batman and Red Hood defeat Black Mask's villains but end on bad terms due to Red Hood's deadly tactics.

Alfred receives a package with a lock of green hair and a note from Jason asking for Batman to meet him. Black Mask calls a meeting of his top associates and murders them under the eye of Red Hood. Black Mask and Red Hood fight and Batman arrives just as Red Hood is stabbed in the heart.  Removing Red Hood's helmet, Black Mask sees that it isn't Jason Todd. Batman traps Black Mask and goes to meet Jason.

Jason has kidnapped and savagely beats the Joker, who laughs maniacally until falling silent when Jason says he sees through his crazy act. Batman enters and their brief fight is interrupted when a bomb is dropped on Blüdhaven by the Society, where Dick Grayson now fights crime as Nightwing. Jason tosses a gun to Batman and points his own gun at the Joker's head, saying that Batman must either kill Jason, or let Jason kill the Joker on a count of three. At the last half-second, Batman throws a batarang at Jason. The Joker triggers explosives throughout the building.

Film

The storyline was adapted to an animated film called Batman: Under the Red Hood.

References

Comics about revenge
DC Comics adapted into films
Works about atonement
Red Hood titles
Fiction about resurrection